If You Want Me is a studio album by American country artist Billie Jo Spears. In the United Kingdom, the album was titled as Every Time I Sing a Love Song It was released on United Artists Records in June 1977 and contained ten tracks. Most of the album's material were new recordings, along with some cover tunes. It was the twelfth studio album of her career. Two singles were included on the disc: the title track and "Too Much Is Not Enough". Both reached the top ten and top 20 of the North American country charts in 1977. The album itself also charted on the American country albums survey. It received mixed reviews from critics.

Background, recording and content
Billie Jo Spears had her biggest commercial success during the 1970s with several top ten singles, including the chart-topping "Blanket on the Ground". Other top ten and top 20 singles included "What I've Got in Mind", "Misty Blue" and "If You Want Me". The latter inspired and helped form Spears's next studio album. The disc was recorded in sessions held between January and February 1977 at the Jack Clement Recording Studio in Nashville, Tennessee. The sessions were produced by Larry Butler.

If You Want Me was a collection of ten tracks. Most of the album's material were new recordings, such as the title track, "Too Much Is Not Enough", "Every Time I Sing a Love Song", "The End of Me" and several others. Also included are cover tunes, such as Kenny Rogers's top ten country single "Sweet Music Man" and Kris Kristofferson's top 40 pop single "Lovin' Her Was Easier (than Anything I'll Ever Do Again)".

Release and critical reception
If You Want Me was released by United Artists Records in June 1977. It was distributed as both a vinyl LP and a cassette. In the United Kingdom, the album was issued under the name Every Time I Sing a Love Song and some releases featured a different cover art. 

The album was given mixed reviews music publications. Billboard named it among its "Top Album Picks" in July 1977. "Spears' emotional and sometimes intense vocal style coupled with Larry Butler's production backup that utilizes lots of guitars, strings, steel and drums brings an interpretation of lyrics by some notable songwriters such as Kris Kristofferson, Kenny O'Dell, Kenny Rogers and Geoff Morgan to heights of pleasurable listening," the magazine commented. Alan Cackett of Country Music People magazine gave it an unfavorable review in 1978: "Too many of the slow ballads, which dominate the album, sink into sameness, as Billie Jo and producer Larry Butler work too closely toward the pop crossover market," he commented."

Chart performance and singles
If You Want Me entered America's Billboard Top Country Albums chart in July 1977. It spent only five weeks on the chart, peaking at number 39 later in the month. It was Spears's final album to reach the country albums top 40. Two singles were spawned from the disc. The first was the title track, which served as the lead single and was released by United Artists in April 1977. It became Spears's final single to reach the top ten of the Billboard Hot Country Songs chart, peaking at number eight. It also reached number 17 on Canada's RPM Country Tracks chart in 1977. "Too Much Is Not Enough" was spawned as the second single in July 1977. It reached number 18 on the Billboard country songs chart and number 11 on the RPM country chart.

Track listing

Personnel
All credits are adapted from the liner notes of If You Want Me.

Musical personnel
Tommy Allsup – Bass guitar
Byron Bach – Strings
Brenton Banks – Strings
George Binkley III – Strings
Jimmy Capps – Guitar
Jerry Carrigan – Drums
Marvin Chantry – Strings
Roy Christensen – Strings
Jimmy Colvard – Guitar
Steve Davis – Piano
Pete Drake – Steel guitar
Ray Edenton – Guitar

Jack Eubanks – Guitar
Carl Gorodetzky – Strings
Buddy Harman – Drums
Sheldon Kurland – Strings
Bob Moore – Bass
George Richey – Piano
Hargus "Pig" Robbins – Piano
Billy Sanford – Guitar
Pam Sixfin – Strings
Steven Smith – Strings
Billie Jo Spears – Lead vocals
Gary Vanosdale – Strings

Technical personnel
Larry Butler – Producer
Bill Burks – Design
Bill Justis – String arrangement
The Jordanaires – Background vocals
Ria Lewerke – Art direction
Carol Montgomery – Background vocals
Gary Regester – Photography
Billy Sherrill – Engineer
Bob Sowell – Mastering

Chart performance

Release history

References

1977 albums
Albums arranged by Bill Justis
Albums produced by Larry Butler (producer)
Billie Jo Spears albums
United Artists Records albums